The Port Melbourne Colts Football Club is an Australian rules football club which joined the Southern Football League (Victoria) from 2016.

History
The Club first came into being in 1957.

It was put together by three men, Alex James, Brian " Moppa " McBroom and John Berti. It all started when a group of young men had been playing in the YCW competition, at under 18 level, and having won the Premiership, wanted to stay together after they turned 18.

They then decided to play for a club named, Middle Park YCW, which in fact was the first year of our Club, it was called Middle Park Colts. As just about everyone who played for the team came from Port Melbourne the name was changed in 1958 to Port Colts, and the team commenced to playing at The Lagoon Oval in Graham Street, where we it remained for several years, until finally moving to our present home at Murphy Reserve in the late 60's.

The club originally played in the Sunday Suburban Football League, then the Melbourne Amateur Sunday Football Association. With the demise of the local football Sunday competitions, the Club turned to Saturdays and entered the Metropolitan Football League in 1969, where it remained for 6 years.

The Club then went into the Southern Football League for a few years, then to the Western Suburban League, which soon merged with the Footscray District League, and is now the Western Region Football League.

The club remained in the WRFL after the merge for 16 more years mostly competing in Division 1, before moving back to the Southern League in 2016 where they now compete in Division 1.

The Club originally started with just the one open-age team, until 1972, when the Reserves were added, and then in 1975 the juniors commenced, and have continued to the present day, we now have junior teams from under tens through to senior level for both Men and Women.

Competitions
Sunday Suburban Football League 1957-1960
Melbourne Amateur Sunday Football Association 1961-1968
Metropolitan Football League 1969-1974
South East Suburban Football League 1975-1980
West Suburban Football League 1981-1983
Footscray District League 1984-1999
Western Region Football League 2000-2015
Southern Football Netball League 2016-

Premierships
 Sunday Suburban = 1960
 Metropolitan = 1970, 1971, 1972, 1973
 South East Suburban = 1975 (Division 2)
 West Suburban = 1981 (Division 2)
 Footscray District/Western Region Div 1 = 1998, 1999, 2005, 2006
 Div 2 = 1990
Div 2 Women’s SFNL = 2015
 Southern Football & Netball League Div 2 = 2016

Life Members
 V. Clauscen		1957							
 I. Ross			1960				
 M. Marriner		1961
 B. Green			1964
 A. James #		1965
 B. McBroom #		1966
 D. Manson		    1967
 J. May			1968
 J. Penaluna		1969
 K. O’Hara			1971
 R. Twomey		    1972
 F. Richardson		1973
 G. Briggs			1975
 M. Twomey #		1975
 D. Degenhardt		1977
 A. Leadingham		1977
 P. Burke			1979
 D. Henry			1980
 P. Bailey			1982
 P. McDonald		1987
 M. Sheehan #		1987
 J. Sutcliffe		1988
 C. Boyd			1990
 M. McDonald *		1991
 E. Imbriano		1992
 B. Bracken		1993
 W. Riddoch		1994
 V. Smith			1995
 B. Cockle			1995
 P. McNamee		1996
 M. Penaluna		1996
 G. Winchcombe		1997
 R. Davey			1998
 L. Stuart			1999
 C. Doyle			1999
 B. McQuade		2000
 D. Morris			2001
 M. Riley			2001
 G. Booth			2001
 M. Wood			2001
 P. Ilsley			2002
 T. Maher			2002
 A. Birch			2002
 S. Spencer		2002
 R. Mantle			2002
 C. Riddoch *		2002
 D. Cooper			2003
 P. Snow *			2004
 S. Snow			2005
 S. Critch *		2006
 R. Kelce #		2006
 S. Weir			2007
 C. Morris			2008
 K. Bracken		2008
 P. Van Oost       2009
 J. Perkins		2010
 D. Stevens		2010
 J. Russell		2010
 D. Booth *		2011
 M. Burns			2011
 M. Hargraves		2011
 M. Dawson		    2012
 P. De Bruyn		2013
 J. Clarke			2013
 K. Breen			2014
 E. Stevens		2015
 J. Wharton *		2015
 R. Laing			2016
 F. Caldwell		2016
 B. Jacobs			2016
 S. Massis			2017
 B. Twomey		    2017

Club Legends
 J. Penaluna	    2008
 L. Stuart         2008
 D. Manson         2016

2021
 Senior Coach; Graeme Yeats 
 President; Stephen Duvnjak
 Vice President; Ben Smith
 Treasurer; Eleanor Gurry
 Secretary; Matt Marrangon
 Captain; Justin Taylor & Jake Wood

Honour Board
YEAR    PRESIDENT        |           SECRETARY       |	      TREASURER          |        BEST & FAIREST        |         FOOTBALL COACH        |     SENIOR CAPTAIN           
1957	G. Williamson	            A. James			      J. Berti		             P.O’Brien		                B. McBroom	             A. James
1958	G. Williamson	            A. James			      M. Marriner	             J. Penaluna	                B. McBroom	             R. Fennessy
1959	G. Clauscen	                D. Manson	    	      M. Marriner	             B. Kerr		                B. McBroom	             P. O’Brien
1960*	G. Clauscen	                D. Manson	    	      M. Marriner	             K. Cassidy		                B. McBroom	             B. White
1961	W. Ford / A. James	        V. Clauscen	    	      M. Marriner	             P. Donnelly	                B. McBroom	             P. Donnelly
1962	A. James		            B. Spence			      B. Manson	                 P. Donnelly	                B. McBroom	             L. Aghan
1963	A. James    		        D. Manson	    	      J. May		             L. Aghan		                B. McBroom/J.Penaluna    L. Aghan
1964	A. James	    	        D. Manson	    	      J. May		             R. Jenkins		                B. McBroom	             T. Paulin
1965	A. James		            D. Manson	    	      D. Manson	                 R. Twomey	                    B. McBroom	             D. Manson
1966	A. James		            D. Manson	    	      D. Manson	                 D. McCormack	                J. Penaluna	             J. Penaluna
1967	A. James		            D. Manson	    	      D. Manson	                 J. Clapp		                J. Penaluna	             J. Penaluna
1968	A. James	    	        D. Manson	    	      D. Manson	                 D. McCormack	                J. Penaluna	             J. Penaluna
1969	A. James		            D. Manson	    	      N. Hind		             R. Jenkins		                J. Penaluna	             J. Penaluna
1970*	A. James		            D. Manson	    	      N. Hind		             D. Degenhardt	                J. Penaluna	             J. Penaluna
1971*	A. James		            D. Manson	    	      N. Hind		             M. Twomey	                    J. Penaluna	             J. Penaluna
1972*	A. James    		        D. Manson	    	      N. Hind		             P. Bailey / D. Degenhardt      J. Penaluna	             R. Twomey
1973*	A. James	    	        D. Manson	    	      N. Hind		             D. Degenhardt	                J. Penaluna	             R. Twomey
1974	A. James		            D. Manson	    	      N. Hind		             W. Hanna		                J. Penaluna	             R. Twomey
1975*	A. James		            D. Manson	    	      N. Hind		             T. Doolan		                Jo. Sutcliffe	         Jo. Sutcliffe
1976	A. James    		        T. Stewart			      M. Twomey	                 K. McNamee	                    Jo. Sutcliffe	         Jo. Sutcliffe
1977	A. James	    	        T. Stewart			      M. Twomey	                 D. Degenhardt	                J. May	 	             Jo. Sutcliffe
1978	A. James		            T. Stewart			      M. Twomey	                 Je. Sutcliffe	                J. May	 	             D. Degenhardt
1979	J. Penaluna		            D. Henry			      M. Twomey 	             T. Doolan		                J. May	  	             D. Degenhardt
1980	J. Penaluna		            D. Henry			      M. Twomey	                 P. McDonald	                C. Pasquill	             D. Degenhardt
1981*	J. Penaluna		            D. Henry			      M. Twomey	                 R. Laing		                C. Pasquill	             Je. Sutcliffe
1982	D. Manson    		        D. Henry			      M. Twomey	                 M. Davine		                C. Pasquill	             Je. Sutcliffe
1983	D. Manson	    	        D. Henry			      D. Degenhardt	             G. Winchcombe	                A. Leadingham	         Je. Sutcliffe
1984	D. Manson		            D. Henry			      D. Degenhardt	             A. Birch/R.Laing/F.Caldwell    S. Camov	             S. Camov
1985*	G. Mathieson	            M. McDonald		          D. Henry		             R. Laing		                A. Birch	             R. Davey
1986	G. Mathieson	            M. McDonald		          D. Henry		             F. Caldwell	                A. Birch         	     R. Laing
1987	B. McBroom	                M. McDonald		          J. Lang		             F. Caldwell	                G. Bellesini	         D. Gates
1988	B. McBroom	                M. McDonald		          F. Caldwell	             F. Caldwell	                C. Boyd	                 F. Caldwell
1989	B. Cockle	    	        G. Daley			      M. Sheehan	             C. Doyle		                G. Booth	             G. Booth
1990*	B. McBroom	    	        M. McDonald		          M. Sheehan	             E. Muench	                    G. Booth	             C. Doyle
1991	P. McDonald		            M. McDonald		          M. Sheehan	             G. Booth		                S. McBroom	             M. Dawson
1992	P. McDonald		            M. Penaluna		          B. Cockle		             S. McBroom	                    S. McBroom	             M. Dawson
1993	C. Boyd			            M. Penaluna		          B. Cockle		             D. Cooper		                S. McBroom	             M. Dawson
1994	C. Boyd	    		        M. Penaluna		          B. Cockle		             D. Cooper		                L. Aghan	             M. Dawson
1995	C. Boyd		    	        M. Penaluna		          B. Cockle		             B. Doyle		                J. Love	                 J. Love
1996	P. Ilsley		            M. Penaluna		          B. Cockle		             J. Love		                S. Doyle	             B. Doyle
1997	P. Ilsley		            M. Penaluna		          M. Dell		             K. Daley		                D. Tuddenham	         M. Spence
1998*	P. Ilsley		            M. Penaluna		          M. Dell		             S. Pearce		                D. Tuddenham	         M. Spence
1999*	P. Ilsley	    	        C. Riddoch		          B. Bracken	             S. Pearce		                M. Larkin	             R. Mantle
2000	P. Ilsley		            C. Riddoch		          D. Keltie		             J. Lindsay		                M. Larkin	             S. Pearce
2001	P. Ilsley		            C. Riddoch		          B. Cockle		             A. Newman	                    R. Hart	                 J. O’Neill
2002	W. Bracken	                J. Penaluna		          C. Riddoch	             J. O’Neill		                R. Hart	                 B. Jacobs
2003	P. Van Oost	                J. Penaluna		          C. Riddoch	             J. Lindsay		                J. Clarke	             J. O’Neill*
2004	D. Nettlefold	            J. Penaluna		          P. Ilsley		             J. Lindsay		                J. Clarke	             J. Clarke
2005*	G. Lawrow		            J. Penaluna		          B. Cockle		             E. Webb		                J. Clarke 	             J. Clarke
2006*	M. Hargraves	            P. Snow			          G. Booth		             B. Julier		                J. Clarke	             B. Jacobs
2007	M. Hargraves	            P. Snow			          G. Booth		             S. Caddy		                J. Clarke	             B. Jacobs
2008	P. Ilsley / P. McDonald    	P. Snow			          T. McMaster	             D. Jacobs		                J. Clarke	             B. Jacobs
2009	P. Ilsley		            P. Snow			          T. Troon		             D. Jacobs		                J. Clarke	             B. Jacobs
2010	K. Breen		            P. Snow			          G. Booth		             B. Julier		                P. Lunt	                 B. Twomey
2011	K. Breen		            P. Snow			          J. Wharton / S. Critch	 B. Julier		                P. Lunt	                 B. Twomey
2012	M. Dawson	                P. Snow			          P. Rowlands	             B. Julier / B. Sutcliffe	    B. Burke 	             B. Twomey
2013	J. Perkins / M. Hargraves	D. Booth		          P. & J. Rowlands	         B. Sutcliffe	                B. Burke	             B. Twomey
2014	B. Brown		            P. Snow / B. Donovan	  P. & J. Rowlands	         J. Taylor		                J. Love	                 B. Twomey
2015	B. Brown		            P. Snow		              P. & J. Rowlands	         B. Sutcliffe	                B. Julier	             B. Twomey
2016*	P. Snow		                P. Snow		              M. Pain		             L. Mildenhall	                B. Julier                B. Twomey / S. Massis     
2017	J. Clarke		            P. Snow		              M. Pain		             L. Mildenhall	                G. Daley	             S. Massis / J. Wood
2018	S. Duvnjak 	                A. Cardwell	              J. Penaluna	             J. Wood	        	        G. Daley	             J. Wood
2019	S. Duvnjak 	                S. Duva		              E. Gurry		             C. Deluca	          	        L. Gilbee	             J. Wood / J. Taylor
2020	S. Duvnjak 	                M. Marangon	              E. Gurry		             (N/A)	        	            L. Gilbee 	             J. Wood / J. Taylor
2021	S. Duvnjak 	                M. Marangon	              E. Gurry				                                    G. Yeats	             J. Wood / J. Taylor

References

External links
Official website

Books
A Rearing Stallion – Bob Donovan - -   
History of the WRFL/FDFL – Kevin Hillier - -  
History of football in Melbourne's north west - John Stoward -  

Australian rules football clubs in Melbourne
Australian rules football clubs established in 1957
1957 establishments in Australia
Southern Football League (Victoria)
Sport in the City of Port Phillip